The 1999–2000 Notre Dame Fighting Irish men's basketball team represented the University of Notre Dame during the 1999–2000 NCAA Division I men's basketball season. They finished the regular season with a record of 22–15, 8-8. The team's sole loss was by a 61–75 score against Wake Forest in the NIT Tournament. The team was coached by Matt Doherty in his first year at the school.

Forward Troy Murphy was the team's captain and leading scorer, averaging 22.7 points per game.

Schedule

|-
!colspan=12 style=| Big East tournament

|-
!colspan=9 style=| NIT

Players selected in NBA drafts

References 

Notre Dame Fighting Irish
Notre Dame Fighting Irish
Notre Dame Fighting Irish men's basketball seasons
Notre Dame
Notre Dame